Matrilin-2 is a matrilin protein that in humans is encoded by the MATN2 gene.

This gene encodes a member of the von Willebrand factor A domain containing protein family. This family of proteins is thought to be involved in the formation of filamentous networks in the extracellular matrices of various tissues. This protein contains five von Willebrand factor A domains. The specific function of this gene has not yet been determined. Two transcript variants encoding different isoforms have been found for this gene.

References

Further reading

Extracellular matrix proteins